Timothy Cleland (born 15 December 1984) is an Australian male former water polo player. He was part of the Australia men's national water polo team. At the 2012 Summer Olympics, he competed for the Australia men's national water polo team in the men's event. He competed also at the 2011 World Aquatics Championships.

References

External links
 

1984 births
Living people
Australian male water polo players
Place of birth missing (living people)
Olympic water polo players of Australia
Water polo players at the 2012 Summer Olympics